The 2006 State of Origin series was the 25th year that the annual best-of-three series of interstate rugby league football matches between the Queensland and New South Wales representative teams was contested entirely under 'state of origin' selection rules. It was decided in three matches which drew a total attendance of 180,074. Queensland won the series 2-1, their first outright series victory since 2001 and the first in their record-breaking run of eight consecutive series wins. Prior to game one there was growing concern about the long term future of State of Origin, many commentators were beginning to wonder if Queensland would ever win another series after three consecutive New South Wales victories.



Game I
Craig Gower was originally picked for the New South Wales side at halfback but pulled out because of injury. Matt Orford was forced to turn down selection as cover for Gower, also because of injury. Both Andrew Johns and Trent Barrett turned down coming out of retirement to play in the fixture so eventually Brett Finch was selected to start at halfback in jersey no. 20 for New South Wales as a last-minute inclusion.

The Queensland selectors picked a total of seven State of Origin debutants for game I.

Game I was played at Telstra Stadium, Sydney, and won by New South Wales 17-16, following a late field goal by NSW late-choice halfback, Brett Finch.

Game II
For Queensland, Origin debutant Adam Mogg replaced the injured Greg Inglis

In game II, Queensland levelled the series at home at Suncorp Stadium, Brisbane, with a commanding 30-6 victory.

Game III
Justin Hodges was ruled out of the Queensland side for game III after he re-tore his hamstring and was replaced by Josh Hannay. Steven Bell was also ruled out after he sustained a fractured cheekbone in game II.

After the heavy loss in game II the New South Wales selectors made five changes, bringing in Matt Cooper, Paul Gallen, Craig Gower, Luke O'Donnell and Ben Hornby as well as moving Matt King into the centres, Mark Gasnier to five-eighth and Luke Bailey into the starting side.

Game III was held at Telstra Dome, Melbourne, and was the first decider played at a neutral venue. Some controversial video referring decisions in the first ten minutes of the second half saw Queensland trailing 14-4 with ten minutes remaining. Queensland, however, scored two converted tries in the space of five minutes – first Brent Tate's long-range try after a line break from Thurston and then Lockyer intercepting a Hodgson pass inside New South Wales' own half – to take the match and series, winning 16-14.

The Wally Lewis Medal for player of the series was awarded to Darren Lockyer
The Ron McAuliffe Medal for Queensland player of the series was awarded to Darren Lockyer

New South Wales squad

Queensland squad

See also
2006 NRL season

Footnotes

External links
State of Origin 2006 at rugbyleagueproject.org

State of Origin series
State of Origin series